Billings Township is a civil township of Gladwin County in the U.S. state of Michigan.  As of the 2010 census, the township population was 2,416.

Communities
It was settled in 1875.

Geography

The Tittabawassee River flows south directly through the center of the township, and Wixom Lake occupied the southwestern corner of the township until the Edenville Dam failed in May 2020 and drained the reservoir.

Major highways
 runs south–north and forms most of the western boundary of the township.

Demographics
As of the census of 2000, there were 2,715 people, 1,172 households, and 791 families residing in the township. The racial makeup of the township was 97.02% White, 0.11% African American, 0.74% Native American, 0.07% Asian, 0.52% from other races, and 1.55% from two or more races. Hispanic or Latino of any race were 1.47% of the population.

There were 1,172 households, out of which 24.4% had children under the age of 18 living with them, 54.1% were married couples living together, 9.2% had a female householder with no husband present, and 32.5% were non-families. 26.2% of all households were made up of individuals, and 10.1% had someone living alone who was 65 years of age or older.  The average household size was 2.31 and the average family size was 2.76.

In the township the population was spread out, with 21.1% under the age of 18, 6.2% from 18 to 24, 23.5% from 25 to 44, 31.3% from 45 to 64, and 17.8% who were 65 years of age or older.  The median age was 44 years. For every 100 females, there were 99.5 males.  For every 100 females age 18 and over, there were 100.0 males.

The median income for a household in the township was $31,677, and the median income for a family was $37,292. Males had a median income of $35,817 versus $26,458 for females. The per capita income for the township was $17,999.  About 10.5% of families and 12.4% of the population were below the poverty line, including 18.3% of those under age 18 and 8.0% of those age 65 or over.

References

External links
 Billings Township official website

Townships in Gladwin County, Michigan
Townships in Michigan